The 1985 NCAA Division I-AA football season, part of college football in the United States organized by the National Collegiate Athletic Association at the Division I-AA level, began in August 1985, and concluded with the 1985 NCAA Division I-AA Football Championship Game on December 21, 1985, at the Tacoma Dome in Tacoma, Washington. The Georgia Southern Eagles won their first I-AA championship, defeating the Furman Paladins by a score of 44–42.

Conference changes and new programs

Conference standings

Conference champions

Postseason

NCAA Division I-AA playoff bracket
The top four teams were seeded, and received first-round byes.

References